1,10-Phenanthroline (phen) is a heterocyclic organic compound. It is a white solid that is soluble in organic solvents.  The 1,10 refer to the location of the nitrogen atoms that replace CH's in the hydrocarbon called phenanthrene.

Abbreviated "phen", it is used as a ligand in coordination chemistry, forming strong complexes with most metal ions. It is often sold as the monohydrate.

Synthesis
Phenanthroline may be prepared by two successive Skraup reactions of glycerol with o-phenylenediamine, catalyzed by sulfuric acid, and an oxidizing agent, traditionally aqueous arsenic acid or nitrobenzene.  Dehydration of glycerol gives acrolein which condenses with the amine followed by a cyclization.

Coordination chemistry
In terms of its coordination properties, phenanthroline is similar to 2,2'-bipyridine (bipy) with the advantage that the two nitrogen donors are preorganized for chelation. Phenanthroline is a stronger base than bipy.  According to one ligand ranking scale, phen is a weaker donor than bipy.

Several homoleptic complexes are known of the type  [M(phen)3]2+.  Particularly well studied is [Fe(phen)3]2+, called "ferroin." It can be used for the photometric determination of Fe(II).  It is used as a redox indicator with standard potential +1.06 V.  The reduced ferrous form has a deep red colour and the oxidised form is light-blue.  The pink complex [Ni(phen)3]2+ has been resolved into its Δ and Λ isomers.  The complex [Ru(phen)3]2+ is bioactive.

Copper(I) forms [Cu(phen)2]+, which is luminescent.

Bioinorganic chemistry
1,10-Phenanthroline is an inhibitor of metallopeptidases, with one of the first observed instances reported in carboxypeptidase A. Inhibition of the enzyme occurs by removal and chelation of the metal ion required for catalytic activity, leaving an inactive apoenzyme. 1,10-Phenanthroline targets mainly zinc metallopeptidases, with a much lower affinity for calcium.

Related phen ligands
A variety of substituted derivatives of phen have been examined as ligands.  Substituents at the 2,9 positions confer protection for the attached metal, inhibiting the binding of multiple equivalents of the phenanthroline. Such bulky ligands also favor trigonal or tetrahedral coordination at the metal.  Phen itself form complexes of the type [M(phen)3]Cl2 when treated with metal dihalides (M = Fe, Co, Ni).  By contrast, neocuproine and bathocuproine form 1:1 complexes such as [Ni(neocuproine)Cl2]2.

As an indicator for alkyllithium reagents
Alkyllithium reagents form deeply colored derivatives with phenanthroline.  The alkyllithium content of solutions can be determined by treatment of such reagents with small amounts of phenanthroline (ca. 1 mg) followed by titration with alcohols to a colourless endpoint. Grignard reagents may be similarly titrated.

See also

References

Redox indicators
Chelating agents